William Leslie Loyal Jamieson (19 October 1886 – 4 January 1944) was an Australian rules footballer who played with St Kilda in the Victorian Football League (VFL).

Notes

External links 

1886 births
1944 deaths
Australian rules footballers from Victoria (Australia)
St Kilda Football Club players